Events from the year 1929 in Ireland.

Incumbents
 Governor-General: James McNeill
 President of the Executive Council: W. T. Cosgrave (CnaG)

Events
17 January – all cats from abroad, except Great Britain, are to be kept in quarantine for a period of six months to avoid rabies.
8 February – a Belfast court sentences Fianna Fáil leader, Éamon de Valera, to one month in jail for illegally entering County Armagh.
20 February – Major-General Seán Mac Eoin, the Blacksmith of Ballinalee, is appointed Chief of Staff of the army.
12 May
 After his resignation from the army Major-General Seán Mac Eoin receives the Cumann na nGaedheal nomination in the Sligo-Leitrim by-election.
Maud Gonne MacBride is arrested and charged with seditious libel against the State.
22 May – Northern Ireland general election for the Parliament of Northern Ireland, the first held following abolition of proportional representation and the redrawing of electoral boundaries to create single-seat territorial constituencies. The Ulster Unionist Party retains a substantial majority.
23 June – 300,000 people attend the Pontifical High Mass at the Phoenix Park to mark the end of the Catholic Emancipation centenary celebrations.
11 July – the restored General Post Office, Dublin, is officially opened by President W. T. Cosgrave.
22 July – the Shannon hydro-electric scheme at Ardnacrusha, County Clare is opened.
August – Censorship of Publications Act sets up the Censorship of Publications Board.
21 October – the Shannon Hydro-Electric Scheme is handed over to the ESB (Electricity Supply Board), bringing electricity to Galway and Dublin.
 24 October – start of Wall Street Crash; Ireland's economy suffers.
Six banks in Northern Ireland begin to issue banknotes in sterling.
Primary Certificate introduced, but optional, at end of primary education.
Fordson tractor production is moved to Cork from the United States.
Inishtrahull is depopulated (other than lighthouse keepers).

Arts and literature
 22 April – the first talking film, The Singing Fool starring Al Jolson, opens in the Capitol Theatre, Dublin.
 3 July – Denis Johnston's The Old Lady Says "No!" is premièred by the Gate Theatre in Dublin, directed by Hilton Edwards.
 29 November – Savoy Cinema opens in Dublin with the American colour talkie On with the Show.
 Elizabeth Bowen publishes her novel The Last September, set during the Irish War of Independence.
 Cecil Day-Lewis publishes Transitional Poem.
 Louis MacNeice publishes his poetry Blind Fireworks.
 Tomás Ó Criomhthain's autobiographical  is published.
 Peadar O'Donnell publishes his novel Adrigool.
 George Bernard Shaw's political satire The Apple Cart is first performed (in Warsaw and Malvern).
 W. B. Yeats publishes his poetry A Packet for Ezra Pound and The Winding Stair.

Sport

Football

League of Ireland
Winners: Shelbourne
FAI Cup
Winners: Shamrock Rovers 0–0, 3–0 Bohemians
St Patrick's Athletic F.C. was founded

Gaelic Games
The All-Ireland Champions are Cork (hurling) and Kerry (football).

Golf
Irish Open is won by Abe Mitchell (England).

Births
9 January – Brian Farrell, author, journalist, academic and broadcaster (died 2014).
7 February
 Norman Rodway, actor (died 2001).
 Constance Smith, actress (died 2003).
10 February – Liam Ó Murchú, television broadcaster (died 2015).
14 February – Noel Lemass, Fianna Fáil TD (died 1976).
27 February – Richie Ryan, Fine Gael TD, Cabinet Minister and MEP (died 2019).
11 March – Erskine Barton Childers, writer and broadcaster (died 1996).
15 March – Paddy Buggy, Kilkenny hurler, President of the Gaelic Athletic Association (died 2013).
1 April – Michael O'Herlihy, television director (died 1997).
9 April – James McLoughlin, Roman Catholic Bishop of Galway (died 2005).
14 May – Brendan O'Reilly, broadcaster and actor (died 2001).
9 June – Shay Gibbons, international soccer player (died 2006).
11 July – David Kelly, actor (died 2012).
20 August – Kevin Heffernan, Gaelic footballer and manager (died 2013).
7 September – T. P. McKenna, character actor (died 2011).
9 September – Mervyn Jaffey, cricketer.
17 September – David Craig, Chief of the Air Staff (United Kingdom).
9 October – Michael Dargan, cricketer.
16 October – James Kelly, Irish Army officer cleared of attempting to import arms for the IRA in the 1970 Arms Trial (died 2003).
28 October – Paddy Keaveney, Independent Fianna Fáil TD (died 1995).
20 November – Ned Power, Waterford hurler (died 2007).
21 November – Niall Toibin, comedian and actor (died 2019).
 23 December – Ouida Ramón-Moliner, anaesthetist (died 2020). 
Full date unknown
Camille Souter, English-born painter.
Tim Sweeney, hurler (died 2018).

Deaths
February – Jim Connell, political activist, writer of The Red Flag (born 1852).
6 March – Thomas Taggart, politician in the United States (born 1856; died in U.S.)
23 March – William Sears, newspaper proprietor, member of 1st Dáil representing South Mayo (Pro Treaty).
27 April – Austin Stack, Sinn Féin MP and TD, member of 1st Dáil (born 1879).
28 April – Alice Stopford Green, historian and nationalist, Independent member of the Seanad in 1922, 1925 and 1928 (born 1847).
29 April – Otto Jaffe, twice elected as Irish Unionist Party Lord Mayor of Belfast (born 1846).
1 May – Henry Jones Thaddeus, painter (born 1859; died on Isle of Wight).
28 May – Alice Stopford Green, nationalist, historian and journalist (born 1847).
5 July – Ted Sullivan, Major League Baseball player and manager (born 1851; died in U.S.)
12 July – Sir Nugent Everard, 1st Baronet soldier, Seanad member (born 1849).
11 August – Jer Doheny, Kilkenny hurler (born 1874).
10 October – Rose Mary Barton, watercolourist (born 1856).
19 October – Feardorcha Ó Conaill, Gaelic scholar (born 1876; died in traffic accident)
18 November – T. P. O'Connor, journalist and member of parliament (born 1848).
Full date unknown – Grace Rhys, novelist (born 1865; died in U.S.)

References

 
1920s in Ireland
Ireland
Years of the 20th century in Ireland